A History (1986–1989) is a compilation album by The Golden Palominos, released on July 21, 1992, by Mau Mau Records. It contains songs from Blast of Silence (Axed My Baby for a Nickel) and A Dead Horse, excluding "Brides of Jesus" from the former and "Over" from the latter.

Track listing

References

External links 
 

1992 compilation albums
The Golden Palominos albums
Albums produced by Anton Fier